Demographics of Guinea describes the condition and overview of Guinea's peoples. Demographic topics include basic education, health, and population statistics as well as identified racial and religious affiliations.

Population

The proportion of children below the age of 15 in 2010 was 42.9%, 53.8% was between 15 and 65 years of age, while 3.3% was 65 years or older
.

Population Estimates by Sex and Age Group (01.VII.2020):

Vital statistics
Registration of vital events is in Guinea not complete. The website Our World in Data prepared the following estimates based on statistics from the Population Department of the United Nations.

Fertility and Births
Total Fertility Rate (TFR) (Wanted Fertility Rate) and Crude Birth Rate (CBR):

Fertility data as of 2012 and 2018 (DHS Program):

Life expectancy

Ethnic groups
Fulɓe (singular Pullo). Called Peuhl or Peul in French, Fula or Fulani in English, who are chiefly found in the mountainous region of Fouta Djallon;
Maninka. Malinke in French, Mandingo in English, mostly inhabiting the savanna of Upper Guinea and the Forest region;
Susus or Soussous. Susu is not a lingua franca in Guinea. Although it is commonly spoken in the coastal areas, including the capital, Conakry, it is not largely understood in the interior of the country.
Several small groups (Gerzé or Kpelle, Toma, Kissis, etc.) in the forest region and Bagas (including Landoumas), Koniaguis etc.), In the coastal area.

West Africans make up the largest non-Guinean population. Non-Africans total about 30,000 (mostly French, other Europeans, and Lebanese). Seven national languages are used extensively; the major written languages are French, Pular, and Arabic.

Other languages have established Latin orthographies that are used somewhat, notably for Susu and Maninka. The N'Ko script is increasingly used on a grassroots level for the Maninka language.

Other demographic statistics 
Demographic statistics according to the World Population Review in 2022.

One birth every 1 minutes	
One death every 5 minutes	
One net migrant every 131 minutes	
Net gain of one person every 1 minutes

The following demographic statistics are from the CIA World Factbook.

Population
13,237,832 (2022 est.)
11,855,411 (July 2018 est.)

Religions
Muslim 89.1%, Christian 6.8%, animist 1.6%, other 0.1%, none 2.4% (2014 est.)

Age structure

0-14 years: 41.2% (male 2,601,221/female 2,559,918)
15-24 years: 19.32% (male 1,215,654/female 1,204,366)
25-54 years: 30.85% (male 1,933,141/female 1,930,977)
55-64 years: 4.73% (male 287,448/female 305,420)
65 years and over: 3.91% (male 218,803/female 270,492) (2020 est.)

0-14 years: 41.4% (male 2,473,486 /female 2,435,139)
15-24 years: 19.23% (male 1,145,488 /female 1,134,103)
25-54 years: 30.8% (male 1,827,246 /female 1,824,162)
55-64 years: 4.72% (male 269,995 /female 289,164)
65 years and over: 3.85% (male 203,754 /female 252,874) (2018 est.)

Median age
total: 19.1 years. Country comparison to the world: 205th
male: 18.9 years
female: 19.4 years (2020 est.)

total: 19 years. Country comparison to the world: 204th
male: 18.8 years 
female: 19.3 years (2018 est.)

Total: 18.9 years
Male: 18.7 years
Female: 19.1 years (2017 est.)

Population growth rate
2.76% (2022 est.) Country comparison to the world: 14th
2.75% (2018 est.) Country comparison to the world: 13th
2.61% (2017 est.)

Birth rate
35.67 births/1,000 population (2022 est.) Country comparison to the world: 13th
36.4 births/1,000 population (2018 est.) Country comparison to the world: 16th

Death rate
8.12 deaths/1,000 population (2022 est.) Country comparison to the world: 82nd
8.9 deaths/1,000 population (2018 est.) Country comparison to the world: 64th

Total fertility rate
4.85 children born/woman (2022 est.) Country comparison to the world: 11st
4.98 children born/woman (2018 est.) Country comparison to the world: 14th

Mother's mean age at first birth
19.9 years (2018 est.)
note: median age at first birth among women 20-49

18.9 years (2012 est.)
note: median age at first birth among women 25-29

Contraceptive prevalence rate
10.9% (2018)
8.7% (2016)

Net migration rate
0 migrant(s)/1,000 population (2022 est.) Country comparison to the world: 89th

Dependency ratios
total dependency ratio: 84.2 (2015 est.)
youth dependency ratio: 78.6 (2015 est.)
elderly dependency ratio: 5.6 (2015 est.)
potential support ratio: 17.8 (2015 est.)

Life expectancy at birth
total population: 63.9 years. Country comparison to the world: 205th
male: 62.04 years
female: 65.82 years (2022 est.)

total population: 62.1 years (2018 est.)
male: 60.4 years (2018 est.)
female: 64 years (2018 est.)

total population: 61 years
male: 59.5 years
female: 62.6 years (2017 est.)

Urbanization

urban population: 37.7% of total population (2022)
rate of urbanization: 3.64% annual rate of change (2020-25 est.)

urban population: 36.1% of total population (2018)
rate of urbanization: 3.54% annual rate of change (2015-20 est.)

Sex ratio
at birth
1.03 male(s)/female
under 15 years
1.02 male(s)/female
15-64 years
1 male(s)/female
65 years and over
0.78 male(s)/female
total population
1 male(s)/female (2011 est.)

HIV/AIDS
Adult prevalence rate: 1.5% (2017 est.)
People living with HIV/AIDS: 120,000 (2017 est.)
Deaths: 5,100 (2017 est.)

Nationality
noun
Guinean(s)
adjective
Guinean

Ethnic groups

Fulani (Peul) 33,4%
Malinke 29,4%
Soussou 21.2%
Guerze 7.8%
Kissi 6.2%
Toma 1.6%
Other/No Answer 4% (2018 est.)

Languages
French (official), each ethnic group has its own language.

Literacy
definition: age 15 and over can read and write (2015 est.)
total population: 39.6%
male: 54.4%
female: 27.7% (2018)

total population: 30.4% (2015 est.)
male: 38.1% (2015 est.)
female: 22.8% (2015 est.)

School life expectancy (primary to tertiary education)
total: 9 years
male: 10 years
female: 8 years (2014)

Major infectious diseases
degree of risk: very high (2020)
food or waterborne diseases: bacterial and protozoal diarrhea, hepatitis A, and typhoid fever
vectorborne diseases: malaria, dengue fever, and yellow fever
water contact diseases: schistosomiasis
animal contact diseases: rabies
aerosolized dust or soil contact diseases: Lassa fever (2016)

note: on 21 March 2022, the US Centers for Disease Control and Prevention (CDC) issued a Travel Alert for polio in Africa; Guinea is currently considered a high risk to travelers for circulating vaccine-derived polioviruses (cVDPV); vaccine-derived poliovirus (VDPV) is a strain of the weakened poliovirus that was initially included in oral polio vaccine (OPV) and that has changed over time and behaves more like the wild or naturally occurring virus; this means it can be spread more easily to people who are unvaccinated against polio and who come in contact with the stool or respiratory secretions, such as from a sneeze, of an “infected” person who received oral polio vaccine; the CDC recommends that before any international travel, anyone unvaccinated, incompletely vaccinated, or with an unknown polio vaccination status should complete the routine polio vaccine series; before travel to any high-risk destination, CDC recommends that adults who previously completed the full, routine polio vaccine series receive a single, lifetime booster dose of polio vaccine

Unemployment, youth ages 15-24
total: 1% (2012 est.)
male: 1.5% (2012 est.)
female: 0.6% (2012 est.)

References